Éamonn O'Doherty (1939 – 4 August 2011) was an Irish sculptor, painter, printmaker, photographer and lecturer. He was best known for his sculptures in public places. He was born and raised in Derry, and died, aged 72, in Dublin.

Well known sculptures by Éamonn O'Doherty include the Quincentennial Sculpture on Eyre Square in Galway and the Anna Livia monument, in 2011 moved to the Croppies' Acre Memorial Park, in Dublin.

O'Doherty also won awards for his paintings, amongst other on the Irish Exhibition of Living Art. An exhibition of his photographs from the collection of the Irish Traditional Music Archive toured around the United States.

In the summer of 1966, O'Doherty was the first manager of Sweeney's Men and had painted the band's logo on the front of their van, from a drawing by Johnny Moynihan. According to Andy Irvine, O'Doherty was quite adept at playing the flute. He had also toured with Irvine in Denmark in the early part of 1966.

Academics
O'Doherty studied at University College, Dublin (UCD), earning a degree in architecture. Later he became lecturer at the Department of Architecture at the Dublin Institute of Technology. In various capacities he also taught on the Dún Laoghaire College of Art and Design (Ireland), the École Spéciale d'Architecture in Paris (France), Harvard University (USA), University of Nebraska (USA) and the University of Jordan (Jordan).

Personal
Éamonn O'Doherty was married to Barbara Ó Brolchain. They had 3 daughters and one son.

See also
 List of public art in Dublin
 List of public art in Galway city

References 

 

Irish sculptors
Artists from Derry (city)
1939 births
2011 deaths
Academic staff of the University of Jordan